Valeria Gorlats (born 31 March 1998) is an Estonian tennis player.

On 31 October 2016, she reached her best singles ranking of world No. 883. On 12 September 2016, she peaked at No. 975 in the doubles rankings.

Playing for Estonia at the Fed Cup, Gorlats has a win–loss record of 3–12.

ITF Circuit finals

Doubles: 2 (runner-ups)

References

External links
 
 
 

1998 births
Living people
Sportspeople from Tallinn
Estonian female tennis players
21st-century Estonian women